Duncan McKay Ronaldson (21 April 1879 – 20 September 1947) was a Scottish professional footballer who played as an inside forward.

References

1879 births
1947 deaths
Footballers from Glasgow
Scottish footballers
Association football inside forwards
Vale of Clyde F.C. players
Rutherglen Glencairn F.C. players
Queens Park Rangers F.C. players
Grimsby Town F.C. players
Bury F.C. players
Norwich City F.C. players
Brighton & Hove Albion F.C. players
Southend United F.C. players
Dunfermline Athletic F.C. players
English Football League players
Southern Football League players
Scottish Football League players
Scottish Junior Football Association players